Ana Terra is a Brazilian film, produced in 1971 and directed for Durval Garcia.

Cast
Rossana Ghessa - Ana Terra
Geraldo Del Rey - Pedro Missioneiro
Pereira Dias - Manuel Terra
Vânia Elisabeth - Henriqueta
Naide Ribas - Antonio
Antonio Augusto Fernandes - Horácio
Rejane Schumann - Eulália
Carlos Castilhos - Major Bandeira
Pedro Machado - chefe dos bandoleiros
Antonio Augusto Fagundes Filho - Pedrinho
Gilberto Nascimento
Alexandre Ostrovski
Augusta Jaeger
Maximiliano Bogo

References

External links
 

1971 films
Brazilian drama films
1970s Portuguese-language films
1971 drama films
Films based on works by Erico Verissimo
Films about gauchos